Jack Daniels may refer to:

People
 Jack Daniels (American football) (1906–1977), American football running back
 Jack Daniels (baseball) (1927–2013), a Major League Baseball outfielder
 Jack Daniels (coach) (born 1933), an Olympian in the modern pentathlon and a coach for cross-country running
 Jack Daniels (politician) (1923–2003), a politician from New Mexico
 Jack Daniels, guitarist of Highway 101
 Jack Daniels, guitarist of War of Ages
 William Daniels (automotive engineer) (1912–2004), an English automotive engineer known as Jack

Other uses
 Jack Daniel's, a brand of whiskey

See also
 Jack Daniel (disambiguation)
 John Daniels (disambiguation)